Kfar Warburg (lit. Warburg Village) is a large moshav in south-central Israel. Located near Kiryat Malakhi with 98 farms  covering an area of 6,000 dunams, it falls under the jurisdiction of Be'er Tuvia Regional Council.

History

The moshav was founded on 31 October 1939 by members of the "Menachem" organisation. It was named after Felix M. Warburg, one of the leaders of the Jewish community in the United States and a founder of the American Jewish Joint Distribution Committee. It was founded on land that had traditionally belonged to the depopulated Palestinian village of Qastina.

In the early 1950s, after the population of Kfar Warburg doubled, a culture hall with a 880-seat auditorium was built at the crossroads of the village's three main roads. Plays by the Habima and Cameri theaters were performed there almost every week.

Notable residents
Yigal Hurvitz, a former Minister of Finance, was buried in the moshav
Aviva Rabinovich, professor of botany, chief scientist at the Israel Nature and Parks Authority and an environmental activist, spent her childhood in the moshav

References

External links

Official website 

Moshavim
Populated places established in 1939
1939 establishments in Mandatory Palestine
Populated places in Southern District (Israel)